North Central Florida is a region of the U.S. state of Florida which comprises the north-central part of the state and encompasses the North Florida counties of Alachua, Marion, Putnam, Bradford, Columbia, Dixie, Gilchrist, Hamilton, Lafayette, Levy, Madison, Suwannee, Taylor, and Union. The region's largest city is Gainesville, home of the University of Florida and center of the Gainesville metropolitan area, which is the largest metro area in North Central Florida. As of 2020, the region had a population of 575,622 people.  

Like the rest of North Florida, including the Florida Panhandle, the region is often recognized as part of the Deep South, as compared to the rest of the state.

The landscape and climate of North Central Florida are distinct from the sub-tropical environment most associated with the rest of the state. The landscape of North Central Florida has gently rolling hills dominated by magnolia trees and large Southern live oak hammocks draped with Spanish moss. The region also has large expanses of pine forests. The climate is quite mild throughout the year but has very distinct winters with temperatures dropping below freezing quite often.

Cities and towns

Economy 
As of 2016, the region had Florida's largest concentration of 18 to 44-year-olds and people with advanced degrees thanks to the presence of the University of Florida and Santa Fe College in Gainesville. 

The City of Alachua is home to one of the State's largest bio and life science corporate sectors. 

Overall, education and healthcare are the leading employers in the region as several major hospitals are located in Gainesville such as the UF Health Shands Hospital, HCA Florida North Florida Hospital, and the Malcolm Randall Veterans Affairs Medical Center. 

Tourism is central to communities such as Cedar Key, White Springs, and Micanopy. 

Leading employers as of 2016 are:

Education 
The following institutions of higher education are located within North Central Florida:

 University of Florida - Gainesville
 Santa Fe College - Gainesville, Alachua, Starke, Archer
 Florida Gateway College - Lake City
 North Florida College - Madison, Live Oak
 College of Central Florida - Chiefland
 North Florida Technical College - Starke
 City College Gainesville

Culture
North Central Florida is world-renowned for its fresh water springs and rivers which make it one of the best cave diving regions in the world. Several of the springs are connected to the Suwannee and Santa Fe River systems, some of the more popular being:

 Ginnie Springs
 Wes Skiles Peacock Springs
 Devil's Den
 Blue Grotto Dive Resort
 Manatee Springs

There are a large number of nature parks and cultural centers throughout the area such as:

 Stephen Foster Folk Culture Center State Park
 Big Shoals State Park
 Suwanee River State Park
 Ichetucknee Springs State Park
 Devil's Millhopper Geological State Park
 Paynes Prairie Preserve State Park

Florida pioneer life in the 1800s is the focus at both Morningside Nature Center and Dudley Farm Historic State Park. There are several small, turn-of-the-century towns that represent the culture of the Deep South and are geared toward tourists:

 Cedar Key
 White Springs
 Steinhatchee
 Micanopy
 Melrose

Several museums of note spanning topics such as local and natural history, science, and art are:

 Florida Museum of Natural History
 Samuel P. Harn Museum of Art
 Cade Museum for Creativity and Invention
 P.K. Yonge Library of Florida History
 University Galleries
 Gainesville Fine Arts Association Gallery
 Matheson History Museum
 The Historic Thomas Center
 Cedar Key Museum State Park
 Micanopy Historical Society Museum
 Forest Capital Museum State Park

Gainesville is home to notable performing arts venues like the Curtis M. Phillips Center for the Performing Arts, University Auditorium, Constans Theater, and The Hippodrome Theater. The Gainesville Orchestra has been performing regularly since 1983.

The most popular sporting events are the major sports associated with the University of Florida in Gainesville, including Florida Gator Football, Basketball, and Baseball. Gatornationals is one of the most important annual drag races for the National Hot Rod Association (NHRA).

References

Regions of Florida
Geography of Gainesville, Florida
Alachua County, Florida
Gilchrist County, Florida
Gainesville metropolitan area, Florida